House of My Fathers is a 2019 Sri Lankan multilingual drama thriller film directed by Suba Sivakumaran as her debut film and co-produced by director himself with Dominique Welinski and Santi Pathak for Palmyrah Talkies. It stars Steve De La Zilwa and Darshan Dharmaraj along with Bimal Jayakodi and Dasun Pathirana. Music composed by Forest Christenson.
The film was premiered in New Currents competition at Busan International Film Festival. It has received mostly positive reviews from critics. The film is the first Sri Lankan film acquired international rights by Asian Shadows, a Hong Kong-based sales agency.

Plot

Cast
 Bimal Jayakodi as Asoka			
 Pradeepa as Ahalya		
 Steve De La Zilwa		
 Darshan Dharmaraj
 Dasun Pathirana		
 Deepa Seevaratnam

International screening
The film has screened internationally in many film festivals.

 Busan International Film Festival - New Currents competition
 Mumbai Film Festival - World Cinema Section
 BFI London Film Festival - Debate Strand
 Filmfest Hamburg - Political Competition
 Rotterdam International Film Festival 2019 - Bright Future Section
 Geneva International Film Festival and Forum on Human Rights (FIFDH) 2019 - International Competition
 Seattle International Film Festival 2019 - New Directors Competition

References

External links
 
 Rotten Tomatoes review

2010s Sinhala-language films
2019 multilingual films
2019 films